Syngamia latifusalis is a moth in the family Crambidae. It was described by George Hampson in 1896. It is found in the Tenasserim Hills at the border between Myanmar and Thailand.

References

Moths described in 1902
Spilomelinae